Pakistan is a member of the South Asian Zone of the Olympic Council of Asia (OCA) and has participated in the South Asian Games since the inception of the game in 1984. The Pakistan Olympic Association (POA), formed in 1948, and was affiliated by the International Olympic Committee in the same year.

Pakistan has participated all 13 South Asian Games governed by South Asia Olympic Council.

Pakistan has performed reasonably well since 1984 Kathmandu. Pakistan has been second-ranked team 7 times, third ranked team 4 times, fourth ranked team 2 times.

Best performance witnessed by Pakistan was in 2006 Colombo with 158 total Medals including 43 Gold Medals.

Hosted Games 
Islamabad, Capital of Pakistan has hosted this Multi-Sport Event 2 times : 1989 Islamabad, 2004 Islamabad

Pakistan will host 2023 South Asian Games at Faisalabad, Gujranwala, Islamabad, Sialkot.

Detailed Medals Count 
A red box around the year indicates the games were hosted by Pakistan.

Note : Updated Medal Table after Doping Results

See also 

 Doping at the South Asian Games

References

External links 

 https://www.nocpakistan.org/

 
South Asian Games
2022 in Pakistani sport
Nations at the South Asian Games